Baltimore Blast may refer to:
Baltimore Blast (1980–1992), an indoor soccer team that played in the original Major Indoor Soccer League.
Baltimore Blast, an indoor soccer team that began its existence as the Baltimore Spirit and has played in multiple leagues including the current version of the Major Indoor Soccer League.